Froilano Carmelino da Rocha Machado (22 November 1925 – 24 April 2008) was an Indian politician, advocate, freedom fighter, businessperson, writer, poet and social worker from Goa. He was a former member of the Goa Legislative Assembly representing the Cortalim Assembly constituency from 1977 to 1984. He also served as a speaker of the Goa Legislative Assembly from 1980 to 1984. He was noted for his contributions in the Goa Liberation Movement and Konkani language.

Early and personal life
 
Froilano Machado was born in Vasco da Gama. He hailed from his native village, Nagoa de Verna. Machado completed his  Bachelor of Arts degree at St. Xavier's College at Bombay (now Mumbai). He later did his higher studies in entrepreneurship at Bombay University.

Machado was married to Sara (Sarita) Souza, the couple had three sons and two daughters.

References

External links
 The Goan Voice Deaths

1925 births
2008 deaths
Indian politicians
Goan people
Goa MLAs 1977–1980
Speakers of the Goa Legislative Assembly
People from South Goa district
Goa MLAs 1980–1984
20th-century Indian politicians